In mathematics, the Zahlbericht (number report) was a report on algebraic number theory by .

History
In 1893 the German mathematical society invited Hilbert and Minkowski to write reports on the theory of numbers. They agreed that Minkowski would cover the more elementary parts of number theory while Hilbert would cover algebraic number theory. Minkowski eventually abandoned his report, while Hilbert's report was published in 1897. It was reprinted in volume 1 of his collected works, and republished in an English translation in 1998.

Contents
Part 1 covers the theory of general number fields, including ideals, discriminants, differents, units, and ideal classes. 

Part 2 covers Galois number fields, including in particular Hilbert's theorem 90.

Part 3 covers quadratic number fields, including the theory of genera, and class numbers of quadratic fields.

Part 4 covers cyclotomic fields, including the Kronecker–Weber theorem (theorem 131), the Hilbert–Speiser theorem (theorem 132), and the Eisenstein reciprocity law for lth power residues (theorem 140) .

Part 5 covers Kummer number fields, and ends with Kummer's proof of Fermat's last theorem for regular primes.

References

External links

Introduction to the English Edition of Hilbert's Zahlbericht

1897 in science
1897 non-fiction books
Algebraic number theory
History of mathematics
Mathematics books
Treatises